The Golden Pagoda of Namsai, also known as Kongmu Kham, in the Tai-Khamti language, is a Burmese-style Buddhist temple that was opened in 2010. A sum of 3 crore was spent by Arunachal politician Chowna Mein, who was the local MLA in building the pagoda in a plot provided by the state government. The World Tripiṭaka Foundation is currently developing Kongmu Kham as the first international Tripiṭaka centre in India.

Kathina Civara Dana
The Kathina festival is the largest festival celebrated at the Golden Pagoda. The 2016 ceremony, held on 13 November also saw participation from Thai Buddhist monks. An image of Buddha which was earlier kept at Wat Bowonniwet Vihara known as the Pro Bpor Ror was gifted by the monks on behalf of the king Bhumibol Adulyadej of Thailand. The Thai monks also presented a Kalpatru (Money Tree) to the Golden Pagoda. The ceremony of Loi-Krathong, which is marked by the releasing of floating lamps into the Mungchalinda Buddha pond is also held on the last day of the festival.

References

Buddhist temples in India
Pagodas in India
Religious buildings and structures in Arunachal Pradesh
Buddhism in Arunachal Pradesh